Operator may refer to:

Mathematics
 A symbol indicating a mathematical operation
 Logical operator or logical connective in mathematical logic
 Operator (mathematics), mapping that acts on elements of a space to produce elements of another space, e.g.:
 Linear operator
 Differential operator
 Integral operator (disambiguation)

Computers
 Computer operator, an occupation
 Operator (computer programming), a type of computer program function
 Operator (extension), an extension for the Firefox web browser, for reading microformats
 Ableton Operator, a software synthesizer developed by Ableton

Science
 Operator (biology), a segment of DNA regulating the activity of genes
 Operator (linguistics), a special category including wh- interrogatives
 Operator (physics), mathematical operators in quantum physics

Music
 Operator (band), an American hard rock band
 Operators, a synth pop band led by Dan Boeckner
 Operator (album), a 2016 album by Mstrkrft
 "Operator" (Motown song), a 1965 song recorded by Mary Wells and Brenda Holloway
 "Operator" (That's Not the Way It Feels), a 1972 song by Jim Croce from You Don't Mess Around with Jim
 "Operator" (Midnight Star song) (1984), a 1984 #1 R&B/electronic dance single
 "Operator" (A Girl Like Me), a 2008 song by Shiloh
 "Operator", a 1970 song by the Grateful Dead from American Beauty
 "Operator", a 1975 song by the Manhattan Transfer from The Manhattan Transfer
 "Operator", a 1986 song by Little Richard from Lifetime Friend
 "Operator", a 1993 song by Blue System from Backstreet Dreams
 "Operator", a 1995 song by Real McCoy from Another Night
 "Operator", a 1998 song by Miss Papaya from Pink
 "Operator" (Floy Joy song), a song by British group Floy Joy

Fiction
 Operator No. 5, a pulp fiction hero from the 1930s
 Operator, a fictional group in the Ghost in the Shell series
 Operator (2015 film), a 2015 American action thriller drama film starring Luke Goss
 Operator (2016 film), a 2016 American comedy-drama film starring Martin Starr and Mae Whitman
 The Operator (film), a 2000 film
 The Operator (Marble Hornets), an entity that stalks the main characters in Marble Hornets. It is also known as the Slender Man.
 Operator (play), a 2005 play by David Williamson

Duties 
 Operator (profession), a professional designation used in various industries, e.g.:
 Switchboard operator, a occupation at a company offering telephone services
 Heavy equipment operator, operates heavy equipment used in engineering and construction projects
 Operator (military), a soldier in a special operations force
 Operator (law enforcement), a law enforcement officer who has been trained and certified as an operator to serve on a SWAT team

Other uses
 Operator (sternwheeler), a 1909 ship on the Skeena River
 Network operator, a phone carrier
 System operator, commonly abbreviated as sysop
 Operator grammar, a theory of human language

See also
 Operation (disambiguation)
 Operator-precedence grammar, a grammar for formal languages 
 The Operators (disambiguation)
 Oper (disambiguation)
 Cooperator (disambiguation)